Ernest Pintoff (December 15, 1931 in Watertown, Connecticut – January 12, 2002 in Woodland Hills, Los Angeles) was an American film and television director, screenwriter and film producer.

He won the Oscar for Best Animated Short for The Critic (1963), a satire on modern art written and narrated by Mel Brooks.

Background
Born in Watertown, Connecticut, but raised in New York City, Pintoff originally began as a jazz trumpeter who taught painting and design at Michigan State University. However, he had always shown an interest in the animation of film and began writing in 1956.

Career

His career took off in 1957, when he wrote the script for Flebus, followed by 1959 as a producer and director for the animated short film, The Violinist. Narrated by Carl Reiner, the film earned Pintoff an Oscar nomination and illustrated a promising young career in directing film ahead of him.

In 1963, he won an Oscar for his direction of the 1963 film, The Critic.

On television, Pintoff directed many episodes of popular television series, including Hawaii Five-O (1968), Kojak (1968), The Six Million Dollar Man (1974), The Dukes of Hazard (1979), Falcon Crest (1981) and  Voyagers! (1982). As part of NBC's "Experiments in Television" in the late 1960s, he also directed the documentaries This Is Marshall McLuhan and This Is Sholem Aleichem.

Pintoff produced and directed a number of low-budget independent films such as Harvey Middleman, Fireman (1965), Who Killed Mary What's 'Er Name? (1971) and Dynamite Chicken (1972), a film using a collection of old clips from music with appearances by John Lennon, Richard Pryor and Andy Warhol, Nel mirino del giaguaro (1979).

Following his last film in 1985, Pintoff taught directing at the School of Visual Arts, American Film Institute, USC School of Cinematic Arts, California Institute of the Arts and UCLA.

He received the International Animated Film Society's Winsor McCay Award for prolific lifetime contributions to animation in 1998.

Health

After suffering a stroke in 1985, Pintoff retired from film and turned to writing books, including a memoir, Bolt From the Blue and a novel, Zachary and further books on his love of animation. His health declined again in 2001 and he died of a stroke on January 12, 2002.

Personal life
Pintoff was married to Caroline Pintoff and had two children and three grandchildren.

Selected filmography
Flebus (1957)
The Violinist (1959) - Best Animated Short Academy Award nomination
The Interview (1960) 
The Old Man and The Flower (1962) 
The Critic (1963) - Winner of Best Animated Short Academy Award
Blade (1973)
Jaguar Lives! (1979)

References

External links

The Violinist on Internet Archive
The Violinist on YouTube

Directors of Best Animated Short Academy Award winners
1931 births
2002 deaths
English-language film directors
People from Watertown, Connecticut
Film directors from Connecticut
Producers who won the Best Animated Short Academy Award